What to Do with the Dead Kaiju? is a 2022 Japanese comedy-drama kaiju film directed by Satoshi Miki, starring Ryosuke Yamada, Tao Tsuchiya and Gaku Hamada. It is a co-production between Toei and Shochiku, the first between the two.

Story 
The great kaiju that struck fear to Japan has died. The public cheers and is relieved. The carcass is nicknamed "hope" for the various potentials it could have. However, the carcass rots as it laid there, and fears of an explosion arose. Thus, in order to dispose with the body, the young men and women of the Tokumutai faces the dangerous disposal as the fate of Japan hung on its success.

Cast
 Ryosuke Yamada as Arata Obinata
 Tao Tsuchiya as Yukino Amane
 Gaku Hamada as Masahiko Ame
 Joe Odagiri as Ryo 'Blues' Aoshima
 Toshiyuki Nishida as Kan Nishiotachime
  as Seiichiro Shikishima
  as Sayuri Renbutsu
 Seiji Rokkaku as Hiroto Sugihara
 Toshihiro Yashiba as Manabu Takenaka
  as Murasaki Kawanishi
  as Yamaneko Kunugi
  as Tsukuru Michio
 Megumi as Yuko Amaguri
  as Bokudo Ioroi
 Yōji Tanaka as Hayato Nakajima
  as Yukino's mother
 Kyusaku Shimada as Wataru Nakagaichi
 Takashi Sasano as Jiro Zaizen
 Rinko Kikuchi as Sen Masago
 Fumi Nikaido as Sayoko
 Shota Sometani as Denki Mukogawa
 Yutaka Matsushige as Noboru Yamikumo
  as Suda

Release
What to Do with the Dead Kaiju? was released in Japan on 4 February 2022 and on Blu-ray and DVD on 13 July.

Reception
The film has received negative reviews from both the critics and audience. On the review aggregation website Rotten Tomatoes, the film holds an approval rating of 29% based on 7 reviews, with an average rating of 4.7/10. Japanese audiences took to social media and dubbed this movie "The Devilman of the Reiwa Era", another tokusatsu movie that was received poorly.

Kyle Anderson of Nerdist gave the film a rating of 3.5/5 and wrote that it "deftly straddles the line between satire/parody and legitimate disaster film."

Whang Yee Ling of The Straits Times rated the film 2 stars out of 5 and wrote that despite its "promising" premise, the film is "at once hectic and plodding" and "fares no better even as a parody of Japan's political inertia and bureaucracy."

James Hadfield of The Japan Times rated the film 2 stars out of 5 and wrote that while Fuse "gets the balance just right" and Hamada "has obvious fun playing a villain for a change", the film "seems oblivious to whether any of the ideas it flings against the wall are sticking."

Christopher Stewardson of Our Culture Mag rated the film 2 stars out of 5 and wrote that despite the "solid" first 10 minutes, it "loses itself to clumsy comedy and contrived endings."

 criticized this movie on a J-CAST interview; stating that audiences of this movie were expecting a more dramatic political thriller and military thriller similar to those of Shin Godzilla, only to be met with unfunny gags and a screenplay with little to no realism. Hinataka on Netlabo shared similar sentiments, comparing the movie unfavorably to Don't Look Up.

References

External links
 
 

Japanese comedy-drama films
2022 comedy-drama films
Giant monster films
Kaiju films
2020s superhero films